Pazarköy is a village in the Ezine District of Çanakkale Province, Turkey. Its population is 232 (2021).

References

Villages in Ezine District